Guy Gilbert (born 12 September 1935) is a French Roman Catholic priest and educator.

Biography 

Born in Rochefort, Gilbert was educated at a seminary in Algeria and  ministered in Algiers until 1970. He returned to France, to Paris, where he specialised in working with juvenile delinquents in the working-class 19th arrondissement where there was a sizable pied noir community. He purchased a farm in southern France, in Alpes-de-Haute-Provence, and established the Bergerie du Faucon centre where troubled youngsters might be reeducated and reintegrated into society through work, contact with animals and nature, and self-respect.

Guy Gilbert is thought to be a mentor of and a father figure for Prince Laurent of Belgium. In 2003, he married Laurent and Claire Coombs at the St. Michael and St. Gudula Cathedral in Brussels.  In 2011, he took part in the First Communion of their daughter Princess Louise.

A regular radio correspondent with Radio Notre-Dame, a frequent interviewee on television, a journalist with La Croix, and a prolific author, Guy Gilbert's appearance—his greying hair is long and flowing and he is usually seen in a battered leather jacket— and language are unorthodox. Former President Jacques Chirac made him a chevalier of the Légion d'Honneur. He received the award from Abbé Pierre.

On 12 December 2015 Gilbert officiated the Catholic marriage between Belgian singer Paul Van Haver, known as Stromae, and his wife Coralie Barbier in Martin's Patershof, a former church in Mechelen.

Select bibliography 
  Un prêtre chez les loubards, Stock, 1978
  La rue est mon église, Stock, 1980
  Des jeunes y entrent, des fauves en sortent, Stock, 1982
  L'espérance aux mains nues, Stock, 1984
  Aventurier de l'amour, Stock, 1986
  Avec mon aube et mes santiags, Stock, 1988 
  Les petits pas de l'amour, Stock, 1990 
  Lutte, prie et aime, Éd. du Livre Ouvert, 1991
  Jusqu'au bout, Stock, 1993
  Dieu, mon premier Amour, Stock, 1995, 
  Des loups dans la bergerie, Stock, 1996 
  Dealer d'amour, Stock, 1997
  La violence... un appel ?, Éd. du Livre Ouvert, 1998
  Chemin de croix, Éd. des Béatitudes, 1998
  Aimer à tout casser, Coccinelle BD, 1999
  Cris de jeunes, Salvator, 1999
  Le plus bel album de famille : le rosaire, Éd. des Béatitudes, 2000
  Passeurs de l’impossible, Stock, 2000
  Ma religion, c'est l'Amour, Stock, 2001
  L’Évangile selon saint Loubard, Éd. Philippe Rey, 2003 .
  Peut-on changer ? , Éd. de l'atelier, 2004
  Kamikaze de l'espérance, Stock, 2005
  Les Mystères lumineux, Éd. des Béatitudes, 2005
  L'Évangile, une parole invincible, Éd. Philippe Rey, 2007 .
  Des loups à faucons, Coccinelle BD, 2006
  Et si je me confessais, Stock, 2006
  Rallumez le feu, Éd. Philippe Rey, 2007 .
  Réussis ta vie ! , Éd. Philippe Rey, 2008
  Et si on parlait de tes mômes ? , Éd. Philippe Rey, 2008
  Mes plus belles prières, Éd. Philippe Rey, 2008
  Ose l’amour !, Éd. Philippe Rey, 2009.
  Face à la violence : que pouvons nous faire, Éd. Philippe Rey, 2009
  Lutte et aime là où tu es !, Éd. Philippe Rey, 2009
  La magie des animaux, Éd. Philippe Rey, 2010 .
  Apprends à pardonner, Éd. Philippe Rey, 2010 .
  Cœur de prêtre, cœur de feu, Éd. Philippe Rey, 2010
  La vieillesse, un émerveillement, Éd. Philippe Rey, 2011
  Petit guide de prière, Éd. Philippe Rey, 2011 .
  Éveilleur d'espérance (photos),  Éd. Philippe Rey, 2011 .
  Occupe-toi des autres !,  Éd. Philippe Rey, 2012 .
  Le couple,  Éd. Philippe Rey, 2012 .
  Vagabond de la bonne nouvelle,  Éd. Philippe Rey, 2012 .
  Nos fragilités,  Éd. Philippe Rey, 2013 .
  Le bonheur,  Éd. Philippe Rey, 2013 .
  Jésus, un regard d'amour,  Éd. Philippe Rey, 2013 .
  La nuit s'approche, l'aube va arriver,  Éd. Philippe Rey, 2014 .
  L'humilité,  Éd. Philippe Rey, 2014 .
  La nuit s'approche, l'aube va arriver, Éd. Philippe Rey, 96 pages, 2014. .
  Aime à tout casser !,  Éd. Philippe Rey, 2014 .
  Les sept sacrements, Éd. Philippe Rey, 2015 .
  Prends le temps de vivre, Éd. Philippe Rey, 2015 .
  Vie de combat, vie d'amour, Éd. Philippe Rey, 2015 .
  La Foi, Éd. Philippe Rey, 2016
  La famille, trésor de notre temps, Éd. Philippe Rey, 2016 .
  En cœur à cœur avec Dieu, Éd. Philippe Rey, 2016 .
  Les sourires de Dieu, Éd. Philippe Rey, 2017. .
  La messe, un enchantement déserté, Éd. Philippe Rey, 96 pages, 2017. .

See also
 Streetwise priest

References

External links
 Web site
 Radio interview (11 November 2013)

1935 births
Living people
20th-century French Roman Catholic priests
20th-century French non-fiction writers
French Roman Catholic writers
Chevaliers of the Légion d'honneur
French male essayists
20th-century French essayists
20th-century French male writers
21st-century French Roman Catholic priests